Daniel Brummel (born September 15, 1981 in Pasadena, California) is an American singer-songwriter, composer, producer, and multi-instrumentalist who has performed and recorded with various musical groups including Sanglorians, Ozma, Weezer, Nada Surf, Scott & Rivers, Spain, Gowns, Monstro, and The Elected. He composed the music for the Lifetime network television series American Princess with partners Gwendolyn Sanford and Brandon Jay.

Brummel graduated from the Los Angeles County High School For The Arts in 1999, received his Bachelor of Arts degree in music composition from UCLA in 2006 (where he studied orchestration with Paul Chihara, voice with Don Neuen, and guitar with jazz legend Kenny Burrell) and his Master of Music degree in commercial music from CSULA in 2016. As a singer, bassist, guitarist, keyboardist, and drummer, Brummel has performed consistently on international tours with his various projects since 2001, when The Michigan Daily dubbed him a "pop-culturally aware songsmith" at age 19.  He has also led interfaith community music events, sang protest songs, and performed experimental folk music at the Los Angeles County Museum of Art, the Hammer Museum, the Norton Simon Museum, the Los Angeles Central Library, and the International Association for the Study of Popular Music. In March 2011, Brummel was artist-in-residence at Machine Project Gallery in Los Angeles, where he hosted Skylike Notdoings, a series of events exploring the connection between music, meditation, Eastern spirituality, and dreamwork.

More recently, Brummel cowrote the song "Eulogy For A Rock Band" with Rivers Cuomo and Ryen Slegr for Weezer’s 2014 album Everything Will Be Alright in the End.  He then served as music director and touring member (guitar, keyboards, percussion) for Weezer’s fall 2014 album release tour, coordinating and conducting a new 18 person fan choir in each city.  In 2016, he joined Nada Surf as touring bassist for the North American dates of the "You Know Who You Are" album release tour, substituting for original bassist Daniel Lorca and garnering praise for being "as talented of a musician as the band could have asked for to fill in." In academia, he served as the Dean of the California College of Music from 2015-2019, achieving the institution's initial accreditation through the National Association of Schools of Music, and he currently serves as the Chief Academic Officer for Point Blank Music School in Silver Lake.

Discography

As a Solo Artist 
Speak Easy (Coptic, 2005)
Switched-On Scarlatti (2019)

Sanglorians 
Initiation (2013)
Odalisque (2020)

Ozma 
Boomtown (2014)
Pasadena (Sony BMG, 2007)
Spending Time on the Borderline (Kung Fu, 2003)
The Doubble Donkey Disc (Kung Fu, 2001)
Rock and Roll Part Three (Kung Fu, 2000)

Weezer 
 Everything Will Be Alright In The End (Republic, 2014)
 Pacific Daydream (Crush/Atlantic, 2017)

Nada Surf 
Live on KEXP (Acoustic) (2016)
Live on KEXP (Electric) (2016)

Spain 
Sargent Place (Glitterhouse, 2014)
The Morning Becomes Eclectic Session (Glitterhouse, 2013)
The Soul of Spain (Glitterhouse, 2012)

The Elected 
Sun, Sun, Sun (Sub Pop, 2006)
Me First (Sub Pop, 2004)

Scott & Rivers 
 スコット と リバース (self-titled debut album) (Universal, 2013)
 Nimaime (Sony, 2017)

Gowns 
Broken Bones (Southern Records, 2008)

Jorge Huaman 
In Need Of In-Between (2010)

Irma 
Letter To The Lord (My Major Company, 2011)

We Are Me 
Living In Transit (Atmosphériques, 2014)

Sofa City Sweetheart 
Super(b) Exitos (2019)

Manisha 
All My Sunsets EP (2020)

Jonathan Mann 
Jewish Family Christmas Tree! (2020)

David Prince 
No Hard Feelings (2021)

The Easy Button (band) 
Lost On Purpose (2021)

Film/TV Soundtracks 
American Princess (2019 TV series) (composer, 10 episodes)
(Romance) in the Digital Age (2017)
Kick-Ass 2 (2013)
Geek USA (2013)
Still Waiting... (2009)
Turkish for Beginners (2008)
iCarly (2008)
Zoey 101 (2007)
That Darn Punk (2001)

References

External links
Daniel Brummel official website
Sanglorians official website
Sanglorians Facebook page
Ozma official website
Ozma Facebook page

1981 births
Living people
Singers from California
American indie rock musicians
Musicians from Pasadena, California
UCLA School of the Arts and Architecture alumni
American rock singers
Record producers from California
Los Angeles County High School for the Arts alumni
21st-century American male singers
21st-century American singers
The Elected members